Blake Lawrie (born 10 January 1997) is an Australian professional rugby league footballer who plays as a  and  for the St. George Illawarra Dragons in the NRL.

Background
Lawrie was born in Wollongong, New South Wales, Australia.

He played his junior rugby league for the Dapto Canaries and Western Suburbs Red Devils, before being signed by the St. George Illawarra Dragons.

Playing career

Early career
In 2015 and 2016, Lawrie played for the St. George Illawarra Dragons' NYC team.

2017
In 2017, Lawrie played for the Dragons' Intrust Super Premiership NSW team, Illawarra Cutters. On 1 May, he re-signed with the Dragons on a 2-year contract until the end of 2019. Later that week, he played for the Junior Kangaroos against the Junior Kiwis. On 31 May, he played for the New South Wales under-20s team against the Queensland under-20s team. In round 17 of the 2017 NRL season, he made his NRL debut for the Dragons against the Gold Coast Titans.

2018
Lawrie made a total of 9 appearances for St George Illawarra in the 2018 NRL season as the club qualified for the finals series. Lawrie played in both finals games for the club which were the upset victory in week one against Brisbane at Suncorp Stadium where St George Illawarra won the match 48-18 and the following week where the club lost the elimination final against South Sydney 13-12 at ANZ Stadium.

2019
Lawrie made a total of 23 appearances for St. George Illawarra in the 2019 NRL season as the club endured one of their toughest seasons finishing in 15th position on the table.

2020
Lawrie played 15 games for St. George Illawarra in the 2020 NRL season as the club finished 12th.

2021
On 5 July 2021, Lawrie was fined $20,000 by the NRL and suspended for one game after breaching the game's Covid-19 biosecurity protocols when he  attended a party along with 12 other St. George Illawarra players at Paul Vaughan's property.

On 17 August, it was announced that Lawrie would be ruled out indefinitely with a broken hand which he sustained in the club's loss against Penrith.
Lawrie played a total of 21 matches for St. George Illawarra in the 2021 NRL season as the club finished 11th on the table and missed out on the finals.

2022
On 29 May, Lawrie scored his first NRL try after 91 NRL appearances in their round 12 34-24 win against Canterbury-Bankstown at Belmore Sports Ground.
Lawrie played 24 games for the club throughout the year as they finished 10th on the table and missed the finals.

Statistics

References

External links

St. George Illawarra Dragons profile

1997 births
Living people
Australian rugby league players
Illawarra Cutters players
Junior Kangaroos players
Rugby league locks
Rugby league players from Wollongong
Rugby league props
St. George Illawarra Dragons players